Trevor Muzzy (born May 22) is a GRAMMY award-winning mixer, producer, songwriter, engineer, guitarist, and bassist, known for his work with Jennifer Lopez, Lady Gaga, Jason Derulo, Pitbull, Alejandro Sanz, and Nicki Minaj. He has engineered and mixed tracks that have gone multi-platinum like “On The Floor” (JLo feat. Pitbull), “Starships” (Nicki Minaj), “Judas” (Lady Gaga), and more.

Career

Beginnings 
Originally from the bay area of California, Trevor Muzzy began his career learning bass guitar as a teen. He continued his studies at The University of California San Diego where he majored in Interdisciplinary Computing In The Arts, with a focus on music. In 2009, Muzzy met RedOne, an international music producer, through a friend, and was hired as an engineer and vocal editor. Muzzy also began playing guitar on songs and eventually began mixing them. During these years he engineered, played on, and mixed songs recorded and released by Lady Gaga, JLo, Pitbull, Enrique Igelsias, Kelly Rowland, Jason Derulo, Nicole Scherizinger, Nicki Minaj, and more.

Discography

Notable productions 

 SonReal - "The Aaron LP" (album), "Have A Nice Day" (single), "Last Year" (single), "Parachutes" (single), "Healing (feat. Jessie Reyez)", "Bank On Me" (single), "Ride" (single)

Notable mixes 

 Alejandro Sanz - "Mi Persona Favorita (feat. Camila Cabello)" (single), "#ElDisco" (album), "No Tengo Nada" (single)
 Ricky Martin - "Tiburones" (single)
 SonReal - "Can I Get A Witness" (single), "No Warm Up" (single)
 Pablo Alborán - "Prometo" (album)
 Lady Gaga - "Born This Way" (album), "Angel Down (Work Tape)"
 Nicki Minaj - "Starships" (single), "Pound The Alarm" (single)
 Jennifer Lopez - "On The Floor (feat. Pitbull)" (single), "Love?" (album), "Live It Up (feat. Pitbull)" (single), "A.K.A." (album), 
 Jason Derulo - "Fight For You" (single), "Talk Dirty" (album)
 Fonseca - "Agustín" (album)

Awards

References

Living people
American producers
Year of birth missing (living people)